Kotomi Tosaki (戸崎 琴美 Tosaki Kotomi, born 19 May 1989) is a Japanese volleyball player who plays for Hitachi Sawa Rivale.

Clubs
KyoeiGakuen High School → Hitachi Sawa Rivale (2008-)

National team
 2008 - 1st AVC Women's Cup

References

External links
JVA Biography
Hitachi Sawa Rivale Officialsite Profile

1989 births
Living people
Japanese women's volleyball players
People from Gifu